Barron George Merriman Cangley (12 September 1922 – 2015) was an English cricketer. Cangley was a right-handed batsman. 

He was born at Blakesley, Northamptonshire in September 1922. In 1946, Cangley represented Cambridgeshire in 2 Minor Counties Championship matches against Norfolk and Bedfordshire.

Cangley also played first-class cricket, where he represented Cambridge University in 8 first-class matches, making his debut for the University against Sussex and playing his final first-class match against Oxford University.  All 8 of his first-class matches came in 1947.  In his 8 first-class matches, he scored 295 runs at a batting average of 22.69, with a single half century high score of 76.

He died in 2015 in Victoria, Australia.

References

External links
Barron Cangley at Cricinfo
Barron Cangley at CricketArchive

1922 births
2015 deaths
Alumni of the University of Cambridge
Cambridge University cricketers
Cambridgeshire cricketers
English cricketers
People from West Northamptonshire District